The 2021–22 Kerala Women's League season was the third season of the Kerala Women's League. The season featured 6 teams and all the matches were played at single venue. The season was started in the mid of November 2021. The Kerala Football Association conducted the women's league after a gap 7 years.

Logo 
On 29 October 2021, the official logo for the Scoreline Kerala Women’s League (KWL) was launched by MM Jacob, former Indian international as well as former Kerala coach and player. The launch event was conducted after the final of the 23rd Senior Women’s Inter-District Championship at the Maharaja’s College Stadium Ground in Kochi.

Teams

Standings

 Promoted to Indian Women's League

Awards

References 

2021–22 in Indian football leagues
2021–22 domestic women's association football leagues